English, Texas may refer to places in the United States:
 English, Brazoria County, Texas
 English, Red River County, Texas

See also 
 Texan English